
Gmina Lutowiska is a rural gmina (administrative district) in Bieszczady County, Subcarpathian Voivodeship, in south-eastern Poland, on the border with Ukraine.

The gmina contains part of the protected area called San Valley Landscape Park.

Villages
Gmina Lutowiska contains the villages, settlements and former villages of Beniowa, Bereżki, Brzegi Górne, Bukowiec, Caryńskie, Chmiel, Dwerniczek, Dwernik, Dydiowa, Dźwiniacz Górny, Hulskie, Krywe, Krywka, Łokieć, Lutowiska, Muczne, Nasiczne, Procisne, Pszczeliny, Sianki, Skorodne, Smolnik, Sokoliki Górskie, Stuposiany, Tarnawa Niżna, Tarnawa Wyżna, Ustrzyki Górne, Wołosate, Zatwarnica and Żurawin.

Neighbouring gminas
Gmina Lutowiska is bordered by the gminas of Cisna and Czarna. It also borders Ukraine.

References
 Polish official population figures 2006

Lutowiska
Bieszczady County